Alloblennius is a genus of combtooth blennies (family Blenniidae) found in the western and northeastern Indian Ocean.

Species
There are currently five recognized species in this genus:
 Alloblennius anuchalis (V. G. Springer & Spreitzer, 1978)
 Alloblennius frondiculus Smith-Vaniz & G. R. Allen, 2012
 Alloblennius jugularis (Klunzinger, 1871) (Jugular blenny)
 Alloblennius parvus (V. G. Springer & Spreitzer, 1978) (Dwarf blenny)
 Alloblennius pictus (Lotan, 1969)

References

External links

 Alloblennius at WoRMS
 Alloblennius at the Encyclopedia of Life

 
Salarinae
Taxa named by Victor G. Springer